Alan Doble (27 December 1942 – 15 December 2019) was an Australian cricketer. He played four first-class cricket matches for Victoria between 1964 and 1966.

See also
 List of Victoria first-class cricketers

References

External links
 

1942 births
2019 deaths
Australian cricketers
Victoria cricketers
Cricketers from Melbourne